Marc Singer is an English documentary filmmaker. He was born and raised in London, England, and moved to Florida, United States, when he was 16. After graduating from high school, he moved to New York City.

Singer's first film Dark Days, about a homeless community living in the tunnels underneath New York City, was awarded The Freedom of Expression Award, The Cinematography Award and The Audience Award at the Sundance Film Festival of 2000. Dark Days was also awarded Best Documentary/Non-Fiction film of 2000 by the Los Angeles Film Critics Association and won the Independent Spirit Award for Best Documentary of 2000 from the Independent Filmmaker Project (IFP). Glowing reviews called the documentary "an extraordinarily powerful film" and "intimate, engrossing and at moments, even surprisingly funny", and it was placed on many reviewers' Best Films of 2000 lists. Singer was invited to be a delegate at the University of Colorado annual Conference on World Affairs.

In June 2001, Singer moved to North Central Florida. Working with the Department of Environmental Protection and the Florida Geological Survey, he participated with and documented the efforts of two organizations, Global Underwater Explorers (GUE) and the Woodville Karst Plain Project. Based in High Springs, the divers of G.U.E. and the W.K.P.P. are committed to exploring, understanding, and mapping the labyrinth of water-filled cave systems that make up the Floridan aquifer. Both organizations have, in their explorations, pushed the outer limit of diving technology, accumulating numerous world records in their respective fields of exploration in the process. The short films Singer made are now used as a tool in schools across Florida, teaching children about the importance of water protection and conservation.

Starting in April 2005, Singer was embedded with a United States Marine Corps Force Reconnaissance Platoon for 2 years, training and working on creating a new documentary film.  He was deployed overseas along with the platoon, but, unfortunately, the platoon did not receive the missions they were expecting, and, thus, insufficient footage was filmed to create a documentary.

References

External links

American documentary film directors
British emigrants to the United States
Living people
Year of birth missing (living people)